HMS Porcupine was a P-class destroyer built by Vickers Armstrong on the River Tyne. She was ordered on 20 October 1939, laid down on 26 December 1939 and launched on 10 June 1941. She was commissioned on 31 August 1942, but had a relatively short active career. She was torpedoed in 1942 but salvaged and not finally broken up until 1947.

Career

Porcupine was under the command of Commander George Scott Stewart RAN when  torpedoed her whilst she was escorting the depot ship  from Gibraltar to Algiers on 9 December 1942. U-602 fired four torpedoes at Maidstone, one of which hit Porcupine; the other three missed both British ships.

The attack killed seven men but left most of the ship intact – except for critical localised damage that nearly split the ship in two. The destroyer  rescued all of her crew except a skeleton contingent. After topweight was jettisoned in an attempt to reduce an increasing list,  took her in tow. The next day a French tug took over and delivered Porcupine to Arzew, Algeria.

In March 1943 she was towed to Oran, where she was declared a total loss. French dockworkers there cut the damaged ship into two halves before a decision was made to strip them of all guns, ammunition, mountings, stores, etc., and tow them to Britain. The two parts were ballasted and brought to Portsmouth in June.

Once the two pieces were back in Portsmouth, the fore part of the ship was known informally as HMS Pork, and the rear part as HMS Pine. Reconfigured as accommodation hulks, the two halves were commissioned under those names on 14 January 1944 as Landing Craft Base Stokes Bay, in Portsmouth. They were eventually paid off on 1 March 1946, before being recommissioned for the Commander of Minesweepers on 1 April 1946. Porcupine then became a tender to HMS Victory III.

Fate
Porcupine was finally paid off on 31 August 1946. On 6 May 1946 she was listed as sold, and in 1947 broken up somewhere on the south coast of England – but reports differ as to whether or not this was at Plymouth, Portsmouth or Southampton.

Notes

Bibliography
 
 
 
 
 
 
 
 
 

 

O and P-class destroyers
World War II destroyers of the United Kingdom
1941 ships
Ships built on the River Tyne
Maritime incidents in December 1942
Ships sunk by German submarines in World War II